Rainey Ransom Brandt (born March 12, 1966) is an associate judge on the Superior Court of the District of Columbia.

Education
Brandt received her Bachelor of Arts, Master of Science, and Doctor of Philosophy degrees from American University. She earned her Juris Doctor from Columbus School of Law at the Catholic University of America in 1995.

In 1996, she served as law clerk to Judge Michael Rankin and later to Judge Stephanie Duncan-Peters.

Academic career
Prior to becoming a judge, Brandt was a professor in the Department of Justice, Law and Criminology at American University. She continues to serve as an adjunct associate professor at American University, where her areas of research include the prison system and criminal justice. Brandt's dissertation was about the effects of incarceration on the father-child relationship.

D.C. Superior Court 
On November 7, 2012, Brandt was sworn in as a Magistrate Judge of the Superior Court of the District of Columbia.

On March 21, 2012, President Barack Obama nominated Rainey to the seat vacated by Judge Joan Z. McAvoy who retired; that nomination was returned January 3, 2013. She was renominated on November 15, 2016 to the seat vacated by Judge Lee F. Satterfield; that nomination was returned on January 3, 2017.

President Donald Trump nominated her on September 7, 2017, to the same court to the seat vacated by Judith N. Macaluso. Her nomination expired on January 4, 2019. On March 11, 2019, President Trump renominated Brandt to the same seat on the court. The Senate confirmed her nomination on August 1, 2019, by voice vote. She was sworn in on September 16, 2019. Her official investiture ceremony took place on January 10, 2020.

Personal life 
Brandt lives in Washington, D.C. with her husband Robert W. Brandt, a chief with the U.S. Marshals Service.

References

1966 births
Living people
20th-century American women lawyers
20th-century American lawyers
21st-century American women lawyers
21st-century American lawyers
21st-century American judges
African-American judges
African-American lawyers
American University alumni
Columbus School of Law alumni
Judges of the Superior Court of the District of Columbia
People from LaGrange, Georgia
20th-century African-American women
20th-century African-American people
21st-century African-American women
21st-century African-American people